Neomegamphopidae is a family of amphipods, comprising the two genera Maragopsis and Neomegamphopus. A third genus, Komatopus, may be a synonym of Magaropsis.

References

Corophiidea
Crustacean families